The Vernon Manuscript (Bodleian Library MS. Eng. poet. a. 1) is a medieval English manuscript, written in the dialect spoken in the English West Midlands around 1400, that is now in the Bodleian Library, to whom it was presented around 1677 by Colonel Edward Vernon. It has been described as "the biggest and most important surviving late medieval English manuscript" and "one of the Bodleian Library’s greatest treasures".

The manuscript is lavishly illustrated and decorated, and includes 370 poetry and prose texts on moral or religious subjects, intended to be read by the pious. It has over 700 pages and weighs . The Bodleian Library estimates that the manuscript was compiled around the final decade of the fourteenth century.

An online exhibition of the manuscript is curated by Professor Wendy Scase of the University of Birmingham. A facsimile and transcription are available commercially.

References

External links 
 MS. Eng. poet. a. 1 In the Bodleian Libraries Catalogue of Medieval Manuscripts
 MS. Eng. poet. a. 1 Images available on Digital Bodleian
 University of Birmingham Vernon Manuscript Project
 Bodleian Library online exhibition

Medieval manuscripts
1400 books
14th-century manuscripts
Bodleian Library collection
English manuscripts